Robert Rodgers (July 1, 1895 – June 1, 1934) was an American architect. His work was part of the architecture event in the art competition at the 1932 Summer Olympics.

References

1895 births
1934 deaths
20th-century American architects
Olympic competitors in art competitions
People from Bethlehem, Pennsylvania